Nattapon Malapun (born 10 January 1994) is a Thai professional footballer who plays as a centre back for Thai League 1 club PT Prachuap and the Thailand national team.

International career

In November 2016, he played for Thailand in the 2018 FIFA World Cup qualification (AFC) against Australia.

International

Honours

International
Thailand
 King's Cup (1): 2017

Runner up
 China Cup (1): 2019

Club
Police United
 Thai Division 1 League (1) : 2015
PT Prachuap
 Thai League Cup (1) : 2019

References

External links
 
 

1994 births
Living people
Nattapon Malapun
Nattapon Malapun
Association football defenders
Nattapon Malapun
Nattapon Malapun
Nattapon Malapun
Nattapon Malapun
Nattapon Malapun
Nattapon Malapun